María José Alonso Fernandez (born 22 December 1958) is a full professor of biopharmaceutics and pharmaceutical technology at the University of Santiago de Compostela. The laboratory she leads is specialized in pharmaceutical nanotechnology and nanomedicine, and her research is oriented to the development of nanostructures for targeted delivery of drugs and vaccines. Her discoveries have led to significant clinical advances in the development of potential new treatments for cancer, ocular diseases, skin diseases, diabetes, obesity and other autoimmune pathologies, as well as new vaccines.

Professional experience and scientific career 
María José Alonso has a master's degree in pharmacy (University of Santiago de Compostela – USC, 1985) and a PhD in pharmaceutical technology (USC, 1985). She has also developed her research career at the University of Paris XI and at the University of Angers (France), as well as in the Massachusetts Institute of Technology (MIT).

In 2006–2010 she held the responsibility of Vicerrector of Research and Innovation at the University of Santiago de Compostela. In this role she created a network of research institutes that contributed to the recognition of "Campus of Excellence" by the Ministry of Sciences and Innovation.

She is a member of the National Academy of Medicine (U.S.), a member of the Royal Academy of Medicine of Belgium, and a member of three academies in Spain (Real Academia Nacional de Farmacia, Real Academia de Farmacia de Galicia and Real Academia Galega de Ciencias).

Alonso has held responsibilities in several scientific societies, among them the Controlled Release Society. She first contributed to the CRS as the founder of the Spanish-Portuguese Local Chapter (1994), and later she was Gobernor, Director-at-Large, Secretary and President of this society. Moreover, she is part of the editorial board of 11 scientific journals, and editor-in-chief of the Drug Delivery and Translational Research.

She has coordinated and participated in several research consortia financed by the World Health Organization (WHO), the Bill and Melinda Gates Foundation and the European Commission.

She is the most influential researcher in Spain in the area of pharmacology and pharmacy (h-index), and is also classified among the top ten researchers in her field worldwide (Times Higher Education Ranking).

Drug delivery research 
María José Alonso's Lab is focused on designing novel nanostructured materials intended to transport drugs and antigens across biological barriers (such as cellular, ocular, nasal, skin and intestinal barriers) and deliver them to the target tissue. Alonso's research is specialized in the association of biological compounds, including drugs and antigens to these nanovehicles, with the final goal of producing innovative nanomedicines and vaccines.

Awards and recognitions 
 1985: Extraordinary PhD award for the best PhD of the Faculty of Pharmacy, USC.
 1982: Eloy Díez Award granted by the Eloy Díez Foundation to the best PhD of the year.
 2010: Member of the Galician Academy of Pharmacy (Spain)
 2010: Member of the Spanish Royal Academy of Pharmacy (Spain)
 2011: "Novoa Santos" Award
 2011: "King Jaume I" Award on New Technologies 
 2012: Medal of the General Council of Pharmacy
 2013: "Women in Sciences" Award granted by Xunta de Galicia
 2014: "Maurice Marie Janot Award" granted by the European Pharmaceutical Society (APGI)
 2014: Member of the Royal Academy of Sciences of Galicia (Spain)
 2016: Member of the National Academy of Medicine (U.S.)
 2017: Member of the American Institute for Medical and Biological Engineering’s College of Fellows (AIMBE) (U.S.)
 2018: "Castelao Medal", awarded by Xunta de Galicia
2018: Member of the College of Fellows of the Controlled Release Society 
2018: "CRS Founders Award", granted by the Controlled Release Society
2020: "The Power List" of the 20 most influential researchers in biopharmaceuticals, published by The Medicine Maker
2020: "Distinguished Service Award", granted by the Controlled Release Society, Inc. (CRS, Inc) 
2020: "Women in Science Award", granted by the Controlled Release Society, Inc. (CRS, Inc)
2020: "Medal of Merit in Research and Education", granted by the Ministry of Science and Innovation (Government of Spain)
2021: Member of the Royal Academy of Medicine of Belgium
2022: National Research Award ‘Juan de la Cierva’, granted by the Spanish Ministry of Science and Innovation
2022:  Doctor “Honoris Causa”, University of Nottingham
2022: “ASEICA Woman and Science 2022” and “ASEICA Social Commitment” Award, Spanish Association for Cancer Research

Journal associations 
 Pharmaceutical Research
 Journal of Controlled Release
 International Journal of Pharmaceutics
 European Journal of Pharmaceutics and Biopharmaceutics
 European Journal of Pharmaceutical Sciences
 Drug Development and Industrial Pharmacy
 Drug Delivery Sciences & Technologies
 Journal of Microencapsulation
 Nanomedicine
 Regenerative Engineering and Translational Medicine
Drug Delivery and Translational Research (Editor-in-Chief)

References

External links 
 María José Alonso’s Lab 
 University of Santiago de Compostela (USC) 
 Center for Research in Molecular Medicine and Chronic Diseases (CIMUS) 
 Instituto de Investigación Sanitaria Santiago de Compostela – IDIS
 Real Academia Nacional de Farmacia (Spain) 
 National Academy of Medicine 
 American Institute for Medical and Biological Engineering (AIMBE) 
 Controlled Release Society (CRS)
Drug Delivery and Translational Research (DDTR)

Press 
 “La reina gallega de la nanotecnología”, La Voz de Galicia, 18 December 2016. (Spanish)
 Interview in Diario Médico, 24 October 2016. (Spanish)
 Interview in Correo Farmacéutico, 31 October 2016. (Spanish)
 Interview in ‘Marca España’ (RNE), 21 October 2016. (Spanish)
 Interview in ‘Julia en la Onda’ (Onda Cero), 25 October 2016. (Spanish)
 Interview in 'A Revista' (TVG), 30 November 2016. (Galician)
'La influencer de la nanomedicina', Masticadoresfem, 17 September 2021. (Spanish)

1958 births
Living people
Biomedical engineers
Fellows of the American Institute for Medical and Biological Engineering
Spanish bioengineers
University of Santiago de Compostela alumni
Academic staff of the University of Santiago de Compostela
Spanish pharmacologists
Members of the National Academy of Medicine